Chandra Imam Ali High School and College is a secondary school at Chandra, in Faridganj Upazila of Chandpur District, Bangladesh. It is located near Chandra Bazaar with a riverside position east of the Dakatia River.

References

Schools in Chandpur District
Educational institutions with year of establishment missing
High schools in Bangladesh